Old Trail School may refer to:

Old Trail School (Wiggins, Colorado)
Old Trail School (Bath, Ohio)